How to Steal a Country (theatrically as Att stjäla ett land), is a 2019 South African documentary film directed by Rehad Desai and co-produced by director himself with Anita Khanna and Zivia Desai Keiper.

Synopsis 
The film revolves around an example of the concept of state capture in South Africa, based on the revelations by whistleblowers and investigative journalists of alleged corruption scandals surrounding former President Jacob Zuma and the Gupta family, primarily in the years from 2013 to 2018. The film contains interviews with journalists about their reporting; recorded interviews with key individuals such as Zuma's son Duduzane Zuma; scenes from the 2013 controversial wedding which was preceded by a private aeroplane landing at a South African Air Force base; scenes from a political defeat of Zuma through the election of Cyril Ramaphosa as president of the ANC party in December 2017; scenes from Zuma's 2019 testimony at the Judicial Commission of Inquiry into Allegations of State Capture; as well as aerial images of companies, places, and organisations associated in some way with the scandals, such as Transnet, SAP, KPMG, and the Vrede Dairy Project.

Reception 
The film had its premiere on 26 November 2019 at the IDFA in the Netherlands. The film won two Golden Horns in 2021 at the South African Film and Television Awards. It has received mixed reviews from critics. The film has been used since 2021 in Germany for high-school units on state corruption.

Film title 
How to Steal a Country is also the title of a 2018 book that is not affiliated with this film. It was written by Robin Renwick, a former British diplomat who served as the Ambassador to the Republic of South Africa from 1987 to 1991. In it he also describes the political situation of South Africa under the leadership of Jacob Zuma.

References

External links 
 

2019 films
South African documentary films
2019 documentary films
2010s English-language films